Larry Allen Burright  (born July 10, 1937 in Roseville, Illinois) is a retired American professional baseball player and former second baseman and shortstop.

Career

Burright graduated from Mark Keppel High School, Alhambra, California, and attended Fullerton College. In 1957, he signed with the Dodgers (then still in Brooklyn), and played five full seasons in their minor league organization. 

In 1961, he hit .291 in Double-A and was called up to the major league club in 1962. Burright started 69 games at second base for the 1962 Dodgers, essentially playing the position when the versatile Jim Gilliam moved over to third base. But Burright batted only .205 in 276 plate appearances and committed a costly error in the ninth inning of the decisive Game 3 of the 1962 National League tie-breaker series, which led to an insurance run in the Dodgers' 6–4 loss to the San Francisco Giants.

Burright was traded to the Mets in a multi-player offseason deal for relief pitcher Bob Miller. He hit only .220 in 41 games for the 1963 Mets, lost the regular job to rookie Ron Hunt, and spent much of the campaign with the minor league Buffalo Bisons. The following year, he made the 1964 Mets coming out of spring training, but went hitless in seven early-season at bats and was sent to the minors. 

He retired from baseball in 1965 at the age of 28 after failing to return to the big leagues.

During his MLB career, he amassed 73 hits, including eight doubles, six triples and four home runs.

References

External links

1937 births
Living people
Atlanta Crackers players
Baseball players from Illinois
Buffalo Bisons (minor league) players
Great Falls Electrics players
Los Angeles Dodgers players
Macon Dodgers players
Major League Baseball second basemen
New York Mets players
Omaha Dodgers players
People from Roseville, Illinois
Rochester Red Wings players
San Diego Padres (minor league) players
Spokane Indians players
Sportspeople from Alhambra, California
Thomasville Dodgers players
Victoria Rosebuds players